This is a list of notable Papua New Guineans, people from Papua New Guinea.

Politics 
Dame Josephine Abaijah, former politician
Sir Cecil Abel, missionary, teacher and politician
Sir Peter Barter, former MP for Madang Regional
Sir Julius Chan, former Prime Minister
Sir John Guise, former Governor General of Papua New Guinea
Chris Haiveta, former MP and Governor for Gulf
Joseph Kabui, secessionist leader then first President of the Autonomous Region of Bougainville
Dame Carol Kidu, MP for Moresby South
Sir Charles Lepani, diplomat
Sir Pita Lus, outspoken politician
Sir Albert Maori Kiki
Allan Marat, MP for Rabaul
Sir Paul Lapun, first Papua New Guinean to receive a knighthood
Sir Paulias Matane, former Governor General of PNG
John Momis, MP, current President of the Autonomous Region of Bougainville (2010–)
Sir Mekere Morauta, former prime minister
Jeffrey Nape, Speaker of Parliament (2007–2012)
Sir Rabbie Namaliu, former MP for Rabaul
Sir Joseph Nombri, politician, administrator and diploma
Iambakey Okuk, former deputy prime minister
Peter O'Neill, former Prime Minister (2012–2019)
Francis Ona, rebel leader of Bougainville
Don Polye, MP for Kandep and Minister for Transport & Civil Aviation (2009–2011) Minister of Finance (2011–)
Sir William Skate, former Prime Minister (1995–1998) 
Sir Michael Somare, "Father of the nation", three times Prime Minister (most recently 2002–2011)
Luther Wenge, MP and Governor of Morobe
Paias Wingti, former Prime Minister and Governor of Western Highlands
Theo Zurenuoc, MP for Finschhafen, current Speaker of Parliament (2012–)

Sports
Johnny Aba, only Papua New Guinean to compete for a world boxing title
Makali Aizue, Rugby League
Marcus Bai, Rugby League, thee-time world club championship winner and NRL Premiership Winner
Willie Bera Football, PNG national football team 
Stanley Gene, Rugby League, Captain of PNG Rugby League team in 2008 Rugby World Cup
Francis Kompaon, Paralympic sprinter, first and only PNG Paralympic or Olympic medal winner
Adrian Lam, Rugby League, Sydney Roosters and PNG Rugby League coach
Edward Laboran, Athletics
Ryan Pini, Gold Medalist in swimming at the 2006 Commonwealth Games
Archie Thompson, Football, Melbourne Victory and PSV striker
Dika Loa Toua, Weightlifting
Justin Olam, Rugby League
 Geraint Jones, Ashes winner 2005 and Kent legend and alright wicketkeeper

Others 
 Aro, last person executed in PNG
 Kevin Conrad, environmentalist
 Janetta Douglas, charity worker
 Sir Vincent Eri, author and former Governor-General
 Florence Jaukae Kamel, artist and women's rights activist
 Joseph Kaven, physician
 Dame Jean Kekedo, ombudsman and diplomat
 Dame Mary Kekedo, educator
 Dame Rose Kekedo, first woman to be chancellor at UPNG
 Mary Kini, peace activist
 Mazzella Maniwavie, mangrove scientist and climate activist
 Pilipo Miriye, first Papua New Guinean evangelical missionary to West Africa
 Noah Musingku, creator of purported ponzi scheme, 'Uvistract'
 Bernard Narokobi, philosopher and lawyer
 Cecilia Nembou, educator, women's rights activist, and first female vice-chancellor for a university in Papua New Guinea
 O-shen, reggae musician
 Sir Anthony Siaguru, public servant
 Jerry Singirok, military officer
 William Takaku, actor (theatre, television and film)
 Dame Meg Taylor, lawyer and diplomat
 Pamela Toliman, medical researcher
Sir Alkan Tololo, educator and diplomat
 Megan Washington, jazz and alternative pop/rock singer
 Justin Wellington, singer

References